Brigadier-General John Caillaud (5 February 1726 – December 1812) was Commander-in-Chief, India.

Military career
Caillaud was commissioned into Onslow's Regiment in 1743. In 1746, during the Jacobite rising, he took part in the Battle of Falkirk and the Battle of Culloden. In 1752 he was made a captain in the Madras Army. During the Seven Years' War he was involved with skirmishes with the French.

In 1759 he was made Commander of the Bengal Army. Edmund Burke later claimed that, during the course of the Bengal War, Caillaud had set three official seals to a document expressing an intent to kill Ali Gauhar, the Mughal Crown Prince, allegations that Caillaud strongly denied.

He subsequently became Commander of the Madras Army in which capacity he negotiated a treat with Nazim Ali which guaranteed Nazim Ali military support in return for occupation of the Northern Circars by the East India Company.

In 1775 he retired to Aston Rowant in Oxfordshire and died in December 1812.

Family
In 1763 he married Mary Pechell: they had no children.

References

1726 births
1812 deaths
British Commanders-in-Chief of India
British East India Company Army generals
British Army personnel of the Jacobite rising of 1745
King's Regiment (Liverpool) officers
Military personnel from Dublin (city)